John Gilbert "Sal" Irvine (1 July 1888 – 10 June 1939) was a New Zealand rugby union player. A lock, Irvine represented  at a provincial level on 21 occasions either side of World War I, and was a member of the New Zealand national side, the All Blacks, on their 1914 tour of Australia. On that tour, he played in 10 of the 11 matches, including all three internationals.

References

1888 births
1939 deaths
Rugby union players from Dunedin
New Zealand rugby union players
New Zealand international rugby union players
Otago rugby union players
Rugby union locks